FC Galaks Saint Petersburg was a Russian football team from Saint Petersburg. It played professionally for one season in 1992, taking 19th place in Zone 4 of the Russian Second Division.

In 1994 and 1995 it competed in futsal.

Team name history
 1991: FC Biosvyaz-Student St. Petersburg
 1992–1995: FC Galaks St. Petersburg

External links
  Team history at KLISF

Association football clubs established in 1991
Association football clubs disestablished in 1996
Defunct football clubs in Saint Petersburg
1991 establishments in Russia
1996 disestablishments in Russia